This is an index of restaurant-related lists. A restaurant is a business establishment which prepares and serves food and drink to customers in return for money, either paid before the meal, after the meal, or with a running tab. Meals are generally served and eaten on premises, but many restaurants also offer take-out and food delivery services. Restaurants vary greatly in appearance and offerings, including a wide variety of the main chef's cuisines and service models.

Lists of restaurants

By city

 List of restaurants in Barcelona
 List of restaurants in Hong Kong
 List of restaurants in Istanbul
 List of restaurants in Lagos
 List of restaurants in London
 List of restaurants in Paris
 List of restaurants in Tokyo
 List of restaurants in Vienna

By company
 List of countries with Burger King franchises
 List of countries with Jollibee outlets
 List of countries with KFC franchises
 List of countries with McDonald's restaurants
 List of countries with Subway restaurants
 List of countries with TGI Fridays franchises

By country

 List of restaurant districts and streets
 List of restaurants in China
 List of restaurants in Hungary
 List of restaurants in Iceland
 List of restaurant chains in India
 List of restaurant chains in Ireland
 List of restaurants in Israel
 List of restaurants in Mexico
 List of restaurant chains in the Philippines
 List of restaurant chains in Poland
 List of restaurants in Scotland
 List of restaurants in Singapore
 List of restaurants in South Africa
 List of restaurants in Sweden
 List of restaurants in Switzerland
 List of restaurants in Wales

Australia
 List of restaurants in Australia
 List of pizzerias in Australia

Canada
 List of Canadian restaurant chains
 List of Canadian pizza chains
 List of fast-food chains in Canada

United States
 List of restaurant chains in the United States
 List of pizza chains of the United States
 List of restaurant districts and streets in the United States
 List of restaurants in Hawaii
 List of restaurants in New Jersey
 List of restaurants in Rhode Island
By city location

 List of restaurants in Albuquerque, New Mexico
 List of restaurants in Atlanta
 List of restaurants in Baltimore
 List of restaurants in Boston
 List of restaurants in Cambridge, Massachusetts
 List of restaurants in Cincinnati
 List of restaurants in Houston
 List of restaurants in New Orleans
 List of restaurants in New York City
 List of restaurants in Portland, Oregon
 List of restaurants in Seattle

By cuisine

 List of Ashkenazi Jewish restaurants
 List of bakery cafés
 List of barbecue restaurants
 List of Basque restaurants
 List of Cajun restaurants
 List of chicken restaurants
 List of coffeehouse chains
 List of doughnut shops
 List of fish and chip restaurants
 List of frozen yogurt companies
 List of hamburger restaurants
 List of hot dog restaurants
 List of ice cream parlor chains
 List of Louisiana Creole restaurants
 List of Middle Eastern restaurants
 List of New American restaurants
 List of noodle restaurants
 List of ramen shops
 List of oyster bars
 List of Pacific Northwest restaurants
 List of pancake houses
 List of pizza chains
 List of pizza franchises
 List of Scandinavian restaurants
 List of seafood restaurants
 List of soul food restaurants
 List of Southern restaurants
 List of steakhouses
 List of submarine sandwich restaurants
 List of sushi restaurants
 List of teahouses
 List of Tex-Mex restaurants
 List of vegetarian restaurants

By national cuisine

 List of Chinese restaurants
 List of Cuban restaurants
 List of Czech restaurants
 List of French restaurants
 List of German restaurants
 List of Greek restaurants
 List of Indian restaurants
 List of Irish restaurants
 List of Italian restaurants
 List of Japanese restaurants
 List of Korean restaurants
 List of Lebanese restaurants
 List of Mexican restaurants
 List of Russian restaurants
 List of Spanish restaurants
 List of Thai restaurants
 List of Ukrainian restaurants
 List of Vietnamese restaurants

By owner
 List of Black-owned restaurants
 List of restaurants owned or operated by Gordon Ramsay

By rating

 List of Michelin 3-star restaurants
 List of Michelin 3-star restaurants in the United Kingdom
 List of Michelin 3-star restaurants in the United States
 List of Michelin starred restaurants in Beijing
 List of Michelin starred restaurants in Chicago
 List of Michelin starred restaurants in Florida
 List of Michelin starred restaurants in Guangzhou
 List of Michelin starred restaurants in Hong Kong and Macau
 List of Michelin starred restaurants in Ireland
 List of Michelin starred restaurants in Japan
 List of Michelin starred restaurants in Los Angeles and Southern California
 List of Michelin starred restaurants in the Netherlands
 List of Michelin starred restaurants in New York City
 List of Michelin starred restaurants in Portugal
 List of Michelin starred restaurants in San Francisco Bay Area
 List of Michelin starred restaurants in Scotland
 List of Michelin starred restaurants in Seoul
 List of Michelin starred restaurants in Shanghai
 List of Michelin starred restaurants in Singapore
 List of Michelin starred restaurants in Taipei
 List of Michelin starred restaurants in Thailand
 List of Michelin starred restaurants in Washington, D.C.
 La Liste
 The World's 50 Best Restaurants

By type

 List of biker bars
 List of buffet restaurants
 List of cafeterias
 List of casual dining restaurant chains
 List of delicatessens
 List of diners
 List of dinner theaters
 List of drive-in restaurants
 List of floating restaurants
 List of kosher restaurants
 List of restaurant chains
 List of fast food restaurant chains
 List of defunct fast-food restaurant chains
 List of revolving restaurants
 List of supper clubs
 List of theme restaurants

See also
 Lists of companies (category)
 List of lists

External links